Haraa is an upcoming Indian Tamil-language action film directed by Vijay Sri G starring Mohan in lead role after a hiatus of 14 years. The film also stars Khushbu and Yogi Babu in important roles. Principal photography began on 1 January 2022.

Cast 
Mohan – Ram / Dawood Ibrahim
Khushbu
Yogi Babu
Charuhasan
Manobala
Rajendran

Production

Development 
Director Vijay Sri G who had directed Dha Dha 87 and Powder convinced Mohan to play the lead role in his action film. Vijay Sri said that "Mohan received many offers from different directors but those offers didn’t excite him, but he liked the script of Haraa". The teaser of the film was released on 15 April 2022 and the film wrapped up its second schedule on 24 April 2022 at Coimbatore. The crew released the glimpse of the film on Mohan's birthday (10 May) and confirmed actor Charuhasan's presence in the film. The film is bankrolled by Coimbatore SP Mohan Raj and Jaya Sri Vijay.

Casting 
Actress and politician Khushbu and comedian actor Yogi Babu were confirmed to be a part of the film while actors like Manobala and Motta Rajendran also joined the cast.

Music 

The music of the film is composed by Leander Lee Marty. The first single titled "Kaya Muya" was released on 7 October 2022.

References

External links 
 

Indian action films
Upcoming films